The 1975 Cal State Fullerton Titans football team represented California State University, Fullerton as a member of the Pacific Coast Athletic Association (PCAA) during the 1975 NCAA Division I football season. Led by first-year head coach Jim Colletto, Cal State Fullerton compiled an overall record 2–9 with a mark of 0–5 in conference play, placing last out of six teams in the PCAA. The Titans played home games at Santa Ana Stadium in Santa Ana, California.

Schedule

References

Cal State Fullerton
Cal State Fullerton Titans football seasons
Cal State Fullerton Titans football